The Chicago Cubs Radio Network comprises 30 stations in six states.

Pat Hughes has been the play-by-play announcer since 1996. From 1996 to 2010, Hughes was partnered with Ron Santo. After Santo's death, Keith Moreland took over as color analyst, lasting three seasons (2011–13). Ron Coomer became the color analyst in 2014. Zach Zaidman handles the Cubs Central pre- and post-game shows, and takes over the play-by-play for the fifth inning of most games. 

All 162 regular season baseball games, some spring training games, and all postseason games are broadcast by the network, though not all affiliates distribute the entire slate. The games are transmitted to stations via C-Band satellite service on AMC-8.

From 1925 to 2014 (continuously from 1958 to 2014), the Cubs' flagship station was WGN, 720 AM, the lone radio station of the Tribune Company (which for many years simultaneously owned the Cubs, TV station WGN-TV and its national superstation, and the local newspaper from which it gets its name, the Chicago Tribune). When it was part of the Tribune Radio Network, the network's non-sports programming included the National Farm Report, a farm news feature hosted by Orion Samuelson; Samuelson Sez (a weekly commentary hosted by Samuelson); and Farming America, a farm news feature hosted by Steve Alexander (previously by Max Armstrong).

In 2015, the Cubs' broadcast rights moved to CBS Radio after Tribune Co. declined to renew its longstanding broadcast rights. The 2015 season was broadcast by WBBM. After sister station WSCR's loss of radio rights to broadcast the Chicago White Sox games to WLS in July 2015, it was widely expected that the Cubs would move to WSCR as a replacement. This move was confirmed by CBS Radio on November 11, 2015  and finalized before the start of the 2016 Cubs season. Through WSCR, the games also air on the FM dial via HD Radio through WSCR's subchannel on WBMX (104.3-HD2).

Affiliates

See also
List of XM Satellite Radio channels
List of Sirius Satellite Radio stations

References

Chicago Cubs
Major League Baseball on the radio
Sports radio networks in the United States